The Grotenburg-Stadion is a multi-use stadium in Krefeld, Germany. It is used mostly for football matches and hosts the home matches of KFC Uerdingen 05. The stadium has a capacity of 34,500 and was built in 1927.

Football venues in Germany
KFC Uerdingen 05
Buildings and structures in Krefeld
Sport in Krefeld
Sports venues in North Rhine-Westphalia
Sports venues completed in 1927
1927 in German sport
1927–28 in European football
1927 establishments in Germany